Mr. Krueger's Christmas is a 1980 American Christmas short television film produced by the Church of Jesus Christ of Latter-day Saints, starring James Stewart, directed by Kieth Merrill, with story by Michael H. McLean, and featuring the Mormon Tabernacle Choir. It was first broadcast on NBC on December 21, 1980.

Synopsis
James Stewart plays Willy Krueger, a widowed apartment janitor who lives in a basement flat with his cat George. On a cold Christmas Eve, he daydreams to escape his lonely life: he muses about being a man of culture and means, an ice dance at Temple Square, a sleigh ride, as well as the conductor of the Mormon Tabernacle Choir, and also imagines himself in the stable with Mary, Joseph and the infant Jesus.

Cast
James Stewart as Willy Krueger
Beverly Rowland as Lead Caroller
Kamee Aliessa as Clarissa
Tamara Fowler as Clarissa's mother
Tyson Lewis as Baby Jesus
Gordon Jump as Narrator

Production
Parts of the special were shot in Salt Lake City, Utah.

See also
 
 List of Christmas films

References

External links
 
 
 Mr. Kruegers Christmas on YouTube from the Mormon Channel

1980 in Christianity
1980 television films
1980 films
1980 short films
1980s Christmas films
Christmas television specials
Christmas television films
American short films
NBC television specials
Films directed by Kieth Merrill
Films shot in Salt Lake City
Films produced by the Church of Jesus Christ of Latter-day Saints
Tabernacle Choir
American Christmas television specials
1980s English-language films